Viktor von Struwe (1892-1964) was a German film producer. He also worked as an assistant director on four films. He is sometimes credited as Viktor von Struve.

Selected filmography
 Police Report (1939)
 Maria Ilona (1939)
 Opera Ball (1939)
 Roses in Tyrol (1940)
 Andreas Schlüter (1942)
 A Man with Principles? (1943)
 The Enchanted Day (1944)
 Die Fledermaus (1946)
 The Other Life (1948)
 My Wife Is Being Stupid (1952)
 Roses from the South (1954)
 The Spanish Fly (1955)

References

Bibliography
 Armin Loacker. Im Wechselspiel: Paula Wessely und der Film. Verlag Filmarchiv Austria, 2007.

External links

1892 births
1964 deaths
German art directors
Film people from Riga
Baltic-German people
Emigrants from the Russian Empire to Germany